Raja yogas are Shubha ('auspicious') yogas in jyotish philosophy and tradition. They are believed to give success and a grand rise in career or business, and a greater degree of financial prosperity particularly during the dasha of the planets that give rise to Raja yogas. However, these results get adversely modified by the presence of other Ashubha ('inauspicious') Arista yogas. Basically, the Yoga or Raja yoga-causing planets during the course of their respective dashas confer their most auspicious results if they happen to own the lagna-bhava (the Ascendant) or the Suta-bhava (the 5th house) or the Bhagyasthana (the 9th house); the person remains healthy, wealthy, happy and successful enjoying yoga and Raja yoga results in case the lagna, the 3rd, the 6th, the 8th, the 9th and the 12th houses counted from the lagna are also not occupied by any planet, and the kendras (quadrants) are occupied only by benefic planets.

Meaning of Raja Yoga

The term "Raja yoga" is not defined in the texts dealing with Hindu Predictive astrology. All such planetary situations and combinations that indicate good fortune, wealth, comforts, exercise of ruling power and political influence gained, either by way of inheritance or acquired through self-effort, are termed as Raja yogas.  There are many varieties of Raja yogas but their formation generally involves the 9th, the 10th, the 2nd, the 11th house and the lagna ('Ascendant'), their respective house-lords and their exaltation signs and exaltation lords, which house-lords combining and giving rise to Raja yogas invariably tend to enhance the affairs of the house they occupy, aspect and rule.
In doing so they combine the influence of two types of houses - a) those governing personal initiatives and b) those that show good fortune. Therefore, Raja yogas are generally found in the horoscopes of leaders and famous people 
and reveal their birth to be out of the ordinary.

The results of the yoga or Raja yoga formed owing to a lord of a kendra ('quadrant') (the lord of the 1st, the 4th, the 7th or the 10th counted from the Lagna ('Birth Ascendant') or Natal Moon) and a lord of a trikona ('trine') (the lord of the 1st, 5th or the 9th house) establishing mutual relationship become more pronounced if the lord of another trikona joins them or if their dispositor, preferably the lord of the Ascendant, finds its exaltation in a kendra or a trikona. For any yoga or Raja yoga to produce more effective results the yoga-causing planets possessing requisite six kinds of strength (Shadbala), must form an immediate relationship with the Lagna ('Ascendant'), which is possible by any one of them occupying or aspecting the lagna or by directly associating with the lord of the lagna but without any one of them being afflicted by either natural or functional malefics, or by a lord of a trikasthana (the lord of the 6th, the 8th or the 12th house). Varaha Mihira states that the results of powerless planets are enjoyed in dreams and thoughts only. Moreover, if any planet occupying a particular sign as part of a yoga formation happens to be aspected by the lord of that sign and both occupy auspicious houses then alone a Raja yoga is formed. If the lord of the 9th or the lord of the 10th respectively own the 8th and the 11th, their association will not give rise to an effective yoga or Raja yoga or if they do not conjoin either in the 9th or 10th house. According to Parasara, the most powerful Raja yoga arises when the strong lord of the lagna is in the 5th house and the strong lord of the 5th house occupies the lagna-kendra or if the Atmakaraka ('the planet most advanced in the sign') and the Putrakaraka (chara karaka) are jointly or severally in the lagna or in the 5th house or occupy their exaltation or own sign or navamsa in aspect to a benefic planet and adds that one will be a king if benefic planets occupy the kendras from the Karakamsa ('the navamsa occupied by the Atmakaraka') or if the Arudha lagna and the Darapada are in mutual kendras or trikonas or in the 3rd and the 11th from each other or if the lord of the 10th house placed in its own or exaltation sign aspects the lagna or if the lagna is aspected by the debilitated lord of the 6th, the 8th or the 12th house. If the dispositor of Gulika (Māndi) is in a kendra or a trikona vested with requisite strength in own or exaltation or friendly sign then one possesses a pleasing personality, is popular and famous and enjoys the benefits of Raja yoga, he becomes a powerful ruler.

Raja yogas based on placement of planets

Certain unique placements of planets/house-lords give rise to excellent and exceptional Raja yogas. B. Suryanarain Rao writes that peculiar powers seem to characterise the angular positions of the planets which enable persons born under such combinations to become kings (i.e. acquire ruling powers). In all such cases the strength and the placement of the lord of the Lagna ('Ascendant') is of paramount importance, if it happens to be weak in strength or ill-placed or otherwise afflicted, then auspicious results of good yogas are not experienced. If the lord of the Lagna vested with requisite strength is situated either in a kendra or in the 9th house in its Vargottama navamsa and the lord of the 9th is also either exalted or situated in its own sign attaining vargottama, then a powerful, wealthy and learned ruler is born; this yoga is also known as the Lakshmi Yoga. Other few examples that can be cited under this category are a) the Adhi yoga that arises if benefic planets are situated in the 6th, in the 7th and in the 8th house from the Moon, b) the Mahabhagya yoga which is caused if a male born during day-time has the Sun, the Moon and the Lagna, all three in odd signs or if a night-born female has these three in even signs, C) as Phaladeepika states – when a benefic sign is on the 10th house and the 10th house is occupied by a benefic planet and is aspected by a benefic or benefics and the lord of 10th not being combust occupies a benefic bhava in its own sign or exaltation sign the very favourable Khyati yoga arises making one adept, wealthy and achieve wide and lasting fame, who like a king will protect his subordinates and d) as Jataka Parijata states – if from the bhava occupied by the lord of the lagna the lord of the 4th, the planet occupying the 4th house, the lord of the 9th and the planet occupying the 9th house are all in Shubhvargas, strong and associated with the lagna the person will certainly become a long-lived, mighty and wealthy ruler. This last mentioned yoga is a very rare Raja yoga which will not arise in case the planets causing it are not directly connected with the lagna. Parashara states that if there be a malefic in the 10th house in Sayana-avastha or Bhojana-avastha the person will face many miseries on account of his own deeds but if the Moon is in the 10th in Kautaka-avastha or Prakasana-avastha there will undoubtedly be a Raja yoga.

All planets occupying the kendras gain exceptional strength. Mars and Saturn are natural malefic but both situated in the kendras can confer advancement in life though tending to prove evil towards the end. Saturn in Cancer (when it becomes a temporary friend of Jupiter) and Mars in Capricorn produce prominent persons but not vice versa. Saturn in Libra in a kendra from the Lagna or the Chandra-lagna causing Sasa yoga, a Panch Mahapurusha yoga, gives wealth, status, fame and also ruling power but does not give a happy life because of its square aspect on Cancer and being in the 8th from Pisces the exaltation sign for its dispositor.

The directional strength gained by planets is a vital factor for it is seen that planets possessing Digbala giving rise to yogas and Raja yogas are more effective even if they do not combine well e.g. when Saturn is with the Sun and Mars in the 10th house and Venus is in the 4th there arises a significant Raja yoga.

The trikonas are as sensitive as the kendras if not more; planets in mutual trikonas become effective co-workers. The antra-dasha of the planet situated in a kendra or in a trikona from the dasha-lord generally confers auspicious results. The Sun in the 4th, a retrograde Venus in the 5th with Jupiter situated in the lagna, or Saturn in the 9th, Mars exalted, and Mercury, Venus and Jupiter combining in the 5th house give rise to powerful Raja yogas which yogas illustrate the importance and effectiveness of the trinal aspects of planets more particularly that of Jupiter. If the benefic sign rising in the lagna is occupied by a benefic planet and the lord of the lagna , also a natural benefic, occupies a benefic sign in the 9th house then they invariably make one fortunate, long-lived and enjoy Raja yoga. But the kendras dominated by cruel malefic planets usually prove counter-productive, they prevent effective operation of yogas and Raja yogas, which situation becomes worse with the lord of the lagna and the lord of the 9th afflicted and ill-placed, and not favourably influencing their own bhavas.

Simhasana yoga arises if at the time of birth only the 2nd, the 6th, the 8th and the 12th houses counted from the lagna are occupied by planets; Hansa yoga arises if at that particular moment only the lagna, the 5th, the 9th and the 7th houses are occupied by planets or if planets are situated only in Aries, Aquarius, Sagittarius, Libra and Scorpio (or Leo) signs; planets similarly occupying Cancer, Pisces, Gemini, Virgo and Sagittarius signs give rise to Danda yoga; these are all Raja yogas. However, Simhasana yoga is most effective for persons born in Aries, Libra or Capricorn lagna; Hansa yoga is most effective for those born in Capricorn, Cancer, Aquarius or Gemini lagna, in which eventuality these stated yogas gain the more exalted status of Chilhipuchccha yoga, also known as Yogadhiyoga, and become powerful twice-over.

For a Shuklapaksha ('bright fortnight') day-time birth the exalted lord of the navamsa occupied by the Moon at the time of birth makes one a great orator, invincible, very powerful and highly influential, and enjoy Raja yoga, but if the lords of the navamsas, occupied by the lords of the 2nd, the 5th, the 9th and the 11th house, are all in their respective signs of exaltation then in addition to the enjoyment of Raja yoga one also gains world-wide fame as a great scholar.

There are some Raja yogas described by texts which simply cannot occur,e.g. Varahamihira states that if exalted Mercury occupies lagna, Venus occupies the 10th, the Moon and Jupiter join in the 7th and Saturn and Mars occupy the 5th, the person becomes a ruler, this yoga cannot occur because Mercury cannot be in a kendra from Venus, certainly not 77 degrees apart for this yoga to arise, or if the Moon, Saturn and Jupiter are in the 10th, 11th and lagna respectively, Mercury and Mars in the 2nd and Venus and the Sun in the 4th, which event cannot take place because Mercury can never be in the 3rd house counted from the Sun.

Raja yogas based on conjunction/combination of planets

Sreenatha yoga is caused when at the time of birth the lord of the 7th house is exalted and the lord of the 10th is with the lord of the 9th house. This is an important Raja yoga. If at birth Mercury and the Sun conjoin in the 10th house and Mars is with Rahu in the 6th house, the person becomes chief among men, and if Venus is with Mars in the 2nd house, Jupiter is in Pisces and both Saturn and the Moon are in their respective signs of debilitation a Raja yoga is caused but the person will not be wealthy. The most powerful Raja yoga is produced when, free from the adverse influences of the trika – lords, the lords of the 9th and the 10th or the lords of the 4th and the 5th conjoin in an auspicious sign and bhava. Vide Bhavartha Ratnakara if at the time of birth Mercury, Venus and the Moon are in the 11th house, Jupiter is in Cancer lagna and the Sun occupies the 10th house, one becomes a ruler who is able, brave and famous. Ramanuja calls this the Maharaja yoga which yoga is also found described in Brihat Jataka but along with the mention of Saturn's and Mars' placement.

The lord of the 10th house counted from the stronger of the two, the Lagna or the Chandra-lagna, occupying a kendra or a trikona or the 2nd house vested with required strength by itself gives rise to Raja yoga (Mansagari IV Raja yoga 4). If at the time of birth the Moon is in an Upachayasthana, all benefic planets occupy their own signs and navamsas and all malefic planets are weak in strength the person will rise to be a ruler equal to Indra (Mansagari IV Raja yoga 16). Venus and Mars combining in the 2nd house with Jupiter situated in Pisces, Mercury and Saturn in Libra and the Moon occupying its debilitation sign give rise to Raja yoga, in which event the person will be generous, wealthy, proud and famous ruling a vast territory (Mansagari IV Raja yoga 33). If the Moon combines with the Sun in the first half of Sagittarius sign, Saturn vested with strength is in the lagna and Mars is exalted a mighty much venerated ruler is born (Mansagari IV Raja yoga 65–66).

The conjunction of Jupiter with either Mars or the Moon giving rise to auspicious yogas also pave the ground for Raja yoga-formation, however, Ramanuja states that in these two events the person will be fortunate and prosperous in the dashas of Mars and the Moon but Jupiter's dasha will be ordinary. Saraswati yoga occurring for Gemini lagna involves the conjunction of the lord of the lagna and of the 4th house with the lords of the 5th, the 7th and the 10th occurring in a trikona from the lagna-kendra is a Raja yoga.

Janardan Harji tells us that a famous and generous king is born if at birth Venus and Mars occupy the 2nd house, Jupiter is in Pisces, Mercury in Aquarius and the Sun in Scorpio sign is joined by the Moon or if Venus is in Pisces, the Sun is in the lagna, Mercury is in the 12th house, the Moon is in the 2nd and Rahu is in the 3rd house. A person gains a kingdom or power to rule if at the time of birth Jupiter, Venus and the Moon happen to combine in Pisces sign.

Raja yogas based on mutual association of planets

In most Raja yoga formations planets are seen to associate with each other i.e. they form a mutual relationship. Parashara states that a Raja yoga is certainly caused if the lords of the lagna, the 5th and the 9th combine or associate with the lords of the 4th and the 10th house or if the Moon and Venus aspect each other, or if Jupiter situated in its own sign in the 9th is conjoins Venus and is aspected by the Sun as the lord of the 5th house which yoga is possible for an Aries-born only. A person becomes a leader, gains great political power and mass following if Mercury situated in a kendra or a trikona happens to be aspected by the lord of the 9th house, and the person born with Saturn situated in an Aquarius has four planets occupying their exaltation sign becomes a powerful ruler. If the lord of the 4th house is in the 10th and the lord of the 10th is in the 4th house then a powerful but rare Raja yoga is caused. A very powerful Raja yoga is caused if the Moon, Saturn and Jupiter are in the 10th, 11th and 1st respectively, Mercury and Mars in the 2nd and Venus joins the Sun situated in the 4th house in which event the Full Moon in the 10th will be aspected by Mars and be in mutual aspectual relationship with Venus and the Sun. A powerful Raja yoga also arises if all major planets favourably disposed are in mutual kendras. Thus, irrespective of the sign rising in the lagna if Saturn and Mars conjoin in the lagna, the Moon is un the 4th, Jupiter in the 7th and the Sun in the 10th a person born in a royal family will certainly ascend the throne, if not so born will be very wealthy Saravali. Even though Venus and Jupiter are not mutual friends and Venus is not happily placed in a Martian sign Ramanuja states that Venus confers Raja yoga in its dasha if it is in conjunction with Jupiter in Scorpio.

Parasara calls the kendras the Vishnusthanas and the trikonas, the Lakshmisthanas; their lords in mutual association become yogakarakas and Rajayogakarakas as in the case of Dharma Karmadhipati yoga and Sankha yoga. These lords attaining Parijatadi awastha ('status') make one a ruler who takes care of and protects his subjects; attaining Uttamadi awastha they make one a wealthy ruler; attaining Gopuradi awastha they make one a ruler who is held in high esteem and venerated, and attaining Simhasanadi awastha they make one an all-conquering mighty ruler. Those born under the influence such strong kendra and trikona lords and the lord of the 2nd house, have emerged as great rulers; those blessed with these lords attaining Simhasanasha and Gopuransha have emerged as rulers and Chakravarti Samrats like Raja Harishchandra and Vaivasvata Manu. Yudhishthira was blessed with similarly strong lords as also Shalivahana. Person born with all these seven lords attaining Devaloka awasthas will be the Avatar of Lord Vishnu.

If Jupiter, the Moon and the Lagna are aspected by Saturn, and if Jupiter is in the 9th house, the person born would be a Raja who would write on shastras or sciences (Brihat Jataka XV.4). Bhattotpala records that Kanada, Buddha, Panchashikha, Varahamihira and Brahmagupta were blessed with this yoga. Mandavya states that if there is a Raja yoga along with this yoga, then the person will not be a king but only a scientist, if there are two Raja yogas then he will be a ruling king and also a great writer on sciences like Jina, Kasiraja, Sphujidhvaja and Janaka were.

The number of Rashmis collectively gained by all planets at the time of birth indicate the future course of one’s life, in which regard Janardan Harji in his Mansagari states that the person (blessed with Raja yoga and) who has gained more than thirty-eight Rashmis will certainly become a ruler, the more number of Rashmis one has gained the more powerful and great. According to Parasara the person gaining 31 to 40 Rashmis will be a samanta ('vassal') or a senior/ chief executive or a magistrate or a judge; gaining 41 to 50 Rashmis he will certainly become a ruler of a state and command an army, and beyond 50 Rashmis an all-powerful chief or an emperor; the person blessed with more than 40 Rashmis if born a Kshatriya in a royal family will be a mighty king, in a Vashiya family, a ruler; in a Sudra family, a wealthy person; and in a Brahmin family, a highly regarded and respected scholar-priest. He states that without the knowledge of Rashmis gained correct prediction is not possible and adds that planets having gained more Rashmis and Sthanabala will also make the person an able administrator and renowned; more Rashmis and Digbala, proud and very successful; more Rashmis and Chestabala, an able politician; more Rashmis and Kalabala, very adept and enterprising; more Rashmis and Ayanabala, a family chief; more Rashmis and Uchhabala, a great ruler  and earn much renown, and more Rashmis and Naisargabala will make him prosper in his traditional activities. This is a unique method now seldom employed.

Special or Rare Raja yogas

Raja yogas described in the various texts are numerous, but among those thousands are some that are very special and some that are very rare in occurrence, such as:-

:

 This yoga arises when any one of the five Tara-grahas viz; Mercury, Venus, Mars, Jupiter and Saturn; is in its exaltation, own or moolatrikona rasi in a kendra from the lagna; thus the Panch Mahapurusha yoga that can be formed are five in number called Bhadra yoga, Malvaya yoga, Ruchuka yoga, Hamsa yoga and Sasa yoga respectively.

:

 This yoga arises when benefic planets viz Jupiter, Venus and Mercury(if not acting as a malefic via conjunction)  occupy the 6th, the 7th or the 8th bhavas counted from the Moon provided all planets are vested with requisite strength.  (Source:Jataka Tattva)

:

 This yoga arises if the lord of the sign occupied by the lord of the lagna is in a kendra or a trikona in its exaltation or own sign. (Source: Phaladeepika)

:

 This yoga arises if the lagna is aspected or occupied by benefics and the lord of the lagna situated in an auspicious house is in its exaltation or own sign. (Source: Phaladeepika)

:

 This yoga arises only if Jupiter owns either the 5th or the 11th house and the lords of the 2nd, the 9th and the 11th from the Moon are strongly placed in the kendras or if Jupiter, not weak or debilitated, is in the 2nd, the 5th or the 11th and the lords of the 2nd, the 9th and the 11th are in a kendra from the Moon. (Source: Jataka Parijata)

:

This yoga involves the conjunction of the lords of the evil houses i.e. 3rd, 6th, 8th and 12th, in an evil house or their interchanging of signs with these lords remaining weak in strength.(Source: Bṛhat Parāśara Horāśāstra)

:

This yoga arises if an exalted planet conjoins with a planet in its sign of debilitation, or if a planet in its sign of debilitation attains its exaltation navamsa, or if the lord of the sign occupied by the planet which is debilitated occupies its own exaltation sign, or if the lord of the sign of the planet in debilitation is in a kendra from the Moon, or if the lord of the sign occupied by the planet in debilitation and the lord of its exaltation sign are both in mutual kendras, or if the debilitated planet is aspected by the exalted lord of the sign it occupies. (Source: Phaladeepika) 

There are very many Raja yogas but it is essential to know as to when those Raja yogas would yield their assigned results. The benefits of Raja yoga accrue during the course of the dasha of the Raja yoga causing planets occupying the 10th house from the Lagna or the Chandra-lagna, failing which during the dasha of the strongest planet amongst the planets giving rise to the Raja yoga provided Bhagya ('good luck') also sides the native. The actual exercise of ruling power is not in the destiny of all persons/politicians blessed with powerful Raja yogas who mostly land up serving those actually exercising ruling power. Varahamihira in his Brihat Jataka XI.19, to ascertain when one may get ruling power or lose it or try to overcome the misfortune, states that the person acquires royal power in the sub-period of the most powerful planet or of the planet who is in the 10th or in the Lagna; he loses power in the sub-period of an unfriendly or debilitated planet in which event he must seek protection from a powerful ruler.

Birth at the time of (exact) mid-day (Local Mean Time) or at the time of (exact) mid-night (Local Mean Time) by itself gives rise to Raja yoga.

Mahabhagya yoga, equivalent to Raja yoga, arises if the Lagna, the Sun and the Moon are in odd signs for a male born during day-time or if these three are in even signs for a female born during night-time. Nero born at 7.28 A.M. on 15 December 37 CE was blessed with this yoga; though not born heir he was adopted by Claudius in 50 CE which adoption made him ascend the throne on 13 October 54 CE. Indira Gandhi born on 19 November 1917 at Allahabad was also blessed with this yoga and reaped benefits.

Raja yogas do confer a degree of power and influence but there are certain standard planetary situations that ensure a greater degree of success as a politician. The conjunction of Mars and the Moon or their situation in mutual kendras or trikonas but devoid of benefic influences can make one rich, immoral, untrustworthy, criminal-minded successful businessman or a politician. Mercury aspected by the lord of the 9th house and occupying a kendra or a trikona from the lagna makes one a highly influential politician. Mercury aspected by the lord of the lagna and the lord of the 5th house can make a person a minister. Mars and/or the lord of the 3rd house conjoining with Jupiter aspected by either the lord of the 4th or the 10th house makes one a successful politician. Thiruvalluvar has said - There is nothing more powerful than fate or destiny, what is destined will certainly happen (Thirukkural St. 380). Sanketanidhi (Chapter III.48) highlights the importance of Vargottama lagna, of benefic influences on the Moon and of strong planets occupying the kendras in the case of Raja yoga formations, it states that a Raja yoga is caused if Vargottama lagna rises at the time of birth, a benefic planet is in the 2nd house from the Moon and strong planets are in the kendras from the lagna.

N. Sundarajan states that the astrological factors required for success in politics are the strong lagna, the 5th house, the 10th house and the 4th house and their respective lords; a combination or association or aspect between these four factors (as was in the case of Jawaharlal Nehru), and failure results only when they are weak and mutually unconnected but occupy the evil trika-bhavas or associate with the trika-lords in the Rasi-chart or Navamsa-chart (as was in the case of Morarji Desai). Citing Kumarswamiam he states that the person will be a ruler if the lords of lagna and the 5th aspect the lord of the sign occupied by Mercury or if the lord of the 4th and the 10th or 4th and the 11th exchange signs and Jupiter as the lord of lagna is in the 9th house.

Rajayogabhanga or nullification of Raja yogas

There are certain planetary situations or yogas which can arise and cause Rajayogabhanga so as to nullify the auspicious effects of any one or all Raja yogas that may be present at the time of one's birth. For instance, there will be Rajayogabhanga if there be along with Raja yoga-formation the simultaneous  presence of a planet/planets (other than those involved in the Raja yoga-formation) in debilitation signs or debilitation navamsas, or of planets defeated in planetary war (Grahayuddha) or occupying inimical signs or in bhava-sandhi or planets that are weak, combust or retrograde, or if any one of those planets happens to be in conjunction with Rahu or with the lord of the 6th or the 8th or the 12th, or with the lord of a kendra, a functional malefic.(Source: Uttara Kalamrita) Also, if the Lagna (Ascendant) is neither in vargottama nor aspected by a benefic, and if Trishanku Nakshatra is rising and Saturn is in lagna then too Raja yogas will get nullified.(Source: Saravali) In any Raja yoga formation if the lord of the 10th house happens to occupy the 6th house counted from the 10th the impact of that yoga wiil be slight or for a short period only, there will be no permanent yoga.

If the Raja yogas are loosely knit their results collapse at the prime of life, as was in the case of Napoleon Bonaparte who born in Libra lagna had Saturn, the Raja yogakaraka, conjoining with Mercury, the lord of the 12th house, in the 10th house but ten degrees apart, which afflicted Saturn and destroyed Raja yogas. In the case of Tipu Sultan born in Sagittarius lagna it was the Sun, Mercury, Saturn and Rahu conjunction in the 12th house.

The presence of the Sakata yoga, the Kemadruma yoga, the Kalasarpa yoga, the Daridra yoga, to name a few ava-yogas, either stalls the operation of Raja yogas or completely destroys the Raja yogas. The lord of the 10th situated in the 6th house from the 10th, or either the lord of the 8th or the lord of the 11th associating with the Raja yoga formation or the Sun in its deep debilitation or Venus occupying the 5th house, the 12th or the 2nd house and the lord of the bhava of its occupation weak and afflicted or when all papagrahas occupy the kendras in their inimical or debilitation signs and are aspected by a benefic from a trikasthana ('cadent house'), are a few of the many factors that indicate Rajayogabhanga.

Raja yogas in Jaimini System

According to the Jaimini system of prognostication, when Janma Lagna, Hora Lagna and Ghatika Lagna are simultaneously aspected by a planet, the person becomes a ruler or one equal to him (Sutra I.3.24). A powerful Raja yoga is caused if at the time of birth, Chandra lagna, Navamsa lagna and Drekkana lagna and the 7th house from these three are aspected by one planet (Sutra I.3.25). Jaimini states that if out of the six lagnas, viz., Lagna, Ghatika lagna, Hora lagna, Chandra lagna, Navamsa lagna and Drekkana lagna – one planet sees five and not all the six, the person will enjoy Raja yoga (Sutra I.3.26); B. Suryanarain Rao in his commentary on this sutra tells us that if an exalted planet occupies the Arudha lagna or the Moon, Jupiter and Venus occupy the Arudha lagna and there are no obstructive argalas but only beneficial ones, the person will attain to royal position. If the 2nd, 4th and 5th become equal (in strength etc.) to the Karaka, the person becomes a Raja or equal to him or when the 3rd and the 6th bhavas from Atmakaraka (the planet most advanced in a sign) are equal in strength or if they are joined by malefic, or if from the lords of lagna and the 7th house benefic planets occupy the 2nd, 4th, 5th and 8th house. If to the lord of the lagna or to the lord of 7th, the 5th house is occupied by Jupiter, Venus or the Moon, the person becomes a high Government official and wields political power. If the lord of the lagna aspects the lagna and if the lord of the Karaka lagna aspects that lagna, the person will have very good Raja yogas. The Sun and Jupiter are the karakas ('significators') of the 10th house, any kind of sambandha ('mutual association') established by these two makes one adept and shine in his/her chosen field of creative/scientific/religious/philosophical activity, become a high-ranking official or advisor and famous. Jupiter situated in the Karakamsa i.e.That sign in birth chart which is occupied by Atma karaka in navamsa, makes one master the Vedas or become a philosopher or a religious leader; Venus likewise situated makes one a great political figure. However, B V Raman states that Raja yogas given by Jaimini have not been tested as his method has not been in vogue.

References

Yogas